Elections to Central Bedfordshire Council were held on 4 June 2009. This was the first elections to the newly formed council, with all 66 seats being up for election, elected in wards that matched the previous County Council electoral divisions, but with twice as many councillors being elected in each. All Councillors elected would serve a two-year term, expiring in 2011, when ward boundaries would be reviewed. The Conservative Party won overall control of the council, managing to win 54 of 66 seats on the council.

Result

The overall turnout was 40.59% with a total of 171,328 valid votes cast.

Council Composition

After the election, the composition of the council was:

I - Independent

Ward Results

Ampthill

Barton

Biggleswade

Cranfield

Dunstable Downs

Flitwick East

Flitwick West

Grovebury

Houghton Regis

Icknield

Langford & Henlow Village

Leighton Linslade Central

Marston

Maulden & Houghton Conquest

Northfields

Northill & Blunham

Plantation

Potton

Sandy

Shefford

Silsoe and Shillington

South East Bedfordshire

South West Bedfordshire

Southcott

Stotfold and Arlesey

Toddington

Watling

Woburn & Harlington

References

2009
2009 English local elections